Amanda Petrusich (born c. 1980) is an American music journalist. She is a staff writer at The New Yorker and the author of three books: Pink Moon (2007), It Still Moves: Lost Songs, Lost Highways, and the Search for the Next American Music (2008), and Do Not Sell at Any Price: The Wild, Obsessive Hunt for the World's Rarest 78rpm Records (2014).

Early life 
Petrusich was born circa 1980 and grew up in the New York area, the child of two public school teachers. Her paternal grandparents are Croatian immigrants. She attended the College of William & Mary, where she was co-editor-in-chief of the William and Mary Review and a reviewer for The Flat Hat, the college's campus newspaper. She graduated with a B.A. in English and film studies in 2000, then earned a master's in nonfiction writing from Columbia University in 2003.

Career 
Petrusich has written for The New York Times, Pitchfork Media and Paste. Petrusich has been a staff writer at Pitchfork since 2003, and is a staff writer at The New Yorker. She is the author of Pink Moon, a book on Nick Drake's album of the same name for the 33 1/3 music series, and a 2008 book called It Still Moves: Lost Songs, Lost Highways, and the Search for the Next American Music, which Joe Boyd described in The Guardian as "a terrific piece of travel writing...a tour through the roots of American rural music". Petrusich also wrote a book on record collecting called Do Not Sell At Any Price: The Wild, Obsessive Hunt for the World's Rarest 78rpm Records.

Petrusich serves as clinical assistant professor at the Gallatin School of Individualized Study at NYU. She began teaching at NYU in 2010 and joined the full-time faculty in 2015.

Naming her to its 2016 list of "100 Most Influential People in Brooklyn Culture," Brooklyn Magazine described Petrusich as "a towering force of grace and encouragement in New York music and criticism circles. Between mentoring emerging voices and writing with discernment about music’s most important figures, Petrusich is helping shape Brooklyn culture from the ground up."

Petrusich won a Guggenheim Fellowship in 2016.

In 2019, she was nominated for a Grammy Award for the album notes she wrote for Bob Dylan’s Trouble No More box set.

Personal life
Petrusich was married to physician and writer Bret Stetka from 2005 until his death in 2022. They have a daughter, born in 2021.

Bibliography

Books

Essays and reporting

Culture Desk columns on newyorker.com

Postscript columns on newyorker.com
 
———————
Notes

Notes

External links
 Writer profile from Macmillan website
 Articles by Amanda Petrusich in The Village Voice

1980 births
Living people
American people of Croatian descent
American women journalists
American music journalists
College of William & Mary alumni
Columbia University School of the Arts alumni
New York University faculty
The New York Times people
The New Yorker staff writers
21st-century American journalists
21st-century American women writers